Ed Dubeibat, also spelled El Dubaybat, (Arabic الدبيبات) is a town located in the state of South Kordofan in the Sudan at an altitude of 380 meters above sea level (1246 feet).

Etymology
The word dubeibat in Arabic is a plural of dubeiba, which is a diminutive of dabba, meaning a hummock or a flat small hill. Thus, Dubaybat means the small hummocks.

Topography
The name of the town reflects its topographic feature where Dunes and small separated flat hills dominate the general appearance of the earth's surface.

Transportation hub
Owing to its geographical location Ed Dubeibat, is considered as an important transportation hub in the region connecting South Kordofan to the rest of Sudan with a network of roads and railway.

Paved roads
Ad Dubeibat - Abu Zabad - Fula
Ad Dubeibat - Dalang - Kadugli
Ad Dubeibat - Khartoum (via Kosti)
Ad Dubeibat - Nyala (Sudan)
Ad Dubeibat – Al-Ubayyid

Economy
A Dubeibat is known for its animal production. It is a big market for trading in camels. corps such as Groundnuts, sesame and Sorghum are also cultivated in the area for consumption.

Medical care
There is one hospital, Rural Dubeibat Hospital.

The problem of water scarcity
The city suffers from water scarcity despite its proximity to the areas of Mechanized Rain Farming in South Kordofan, and being located on a groundwater basin. Continuous efforts have been made to resolve this problem. The Aldbebat Water Project was launched in 2012 The total cost of the first phase of the project accounts for 700 thousand Sudanese pounds to finance the drilling of three water wells, including the building of water pipeline 5 kilometers long, and the construction of water treatment plant in the villages of Nabq and Alajurh.

Education
The Government of Japan has contributed to the funding of basic education in the local communities in 2007, with a contribution of about U.S. $172 441

References

Populated places in South Kordofan